Jean-Baptiste-Louis Gros (1793–1870), also known as Baron Gros, was a French diplomat and later senator, as well as a notable pioneer of photography.

Life and career
He entered the French diplomatic service in 1823 and was given the title of baron in 1829 during the Bourbon Restoration. He was despatched to Bogotá (1838–1842) as chargé d'affaires during the Colombian Civil War, and later elsewhere in Latin America, before being recalled to Europe and then sent as Minister Plenipotentiary to Athens in 1850.

He served as Ambassador to London (1852–1863), travelling extensively, including to China and Japan in 1857 and 1858. He was minister-in-command of French troops during the Anglo-French expedition to China (1856-1860). On 9 October 1858, the Treaty of Amity and Commerce between France and Japan was concluded at Edo, to which he was a signatory; this treaty established diplomatic relations between the two imperial nations.

In September 1858, he was named to the French Senate, where he served until his death in 1870.

He produced many famous photographs — chief among them those of the Acropolis in Greece. While he is best known for his daguerrotypes, he painted a few Latin American landscape paintings which are quite striking for their realism. Baron Gros, a member of The Photographic Society, also photographed The Great Exhibition of 1851 in London.

Honours
 Baron (1829) 
 Knight, Order of Santiago (1839) 
 Grand-croix, Légion d'honneur (1861)

See also
 France-Japan relations (19th century)
 List of Ambassadors of France to the United Kingdom

Notes

External links

1793 births
1870 deaths
19th-century French diplomats
19th-century French painters
French male painters
19th-century French photographers
Ambassadors of France to Japan
People of the Second Opium War
Knights of Santiago
Grand Croix of the Légion d'honneur
Ambassadors of France to the United Kingdom
Nobility of the Second French Empire
Barons of France